Henry Lee Thomas Jr. (born January 12, 1965) is an American former professional football player. He played as a defensive tackle in the National Football League (NFL). His nickname was "Hardware Hank."

Early life, family and education
Thomas was born in Houston, Texas. He was a star athlete at Eisenhower High School there.

He attended Louisiana State University, where he played college football for its football team.

Professional football career
Thomas played for the Minnesota Vikings for the first eight seasons of his career. Thomas twice was selected to the Pro Bowl. He joined the Detroit Lions in 1995, where he played two seasons. He subsequently played four seasons with the New England Patriots and retired from the game.

During his entire NFL career, he was responsible for 93.5 sacks and over 800 tackles.

He has been an intern coach for the Indianapolis Colts and Minnesota Vikings.

References

1965 births
Living people
Players of American football from Houston
American football defensive tackles
LSU Tigers football players
Minnesota Vikings players
Detroit Lions players
New England Patriots players
National Conference Pro Bowl players
Ed Block Courage Award recipients